Khunayzir is a Syrian village located in the Mahardah Subdistrict of the Mahardah District in Hama Governorate. According to the Syria Central Bureau of Statistics (CBS), Khunayzir had a population of 2,716 in the 2004 census.

References

Populated places in Mahardah District